Red gum applies to any of several Australian trees including:

 Plant common names